Kozlu is an ilçe (district) in the central part of Zonguldak Province, Turkey. It is situated at the coast of the Black Sea. At  it is west of Zonguldak. It is almost merged with Zonguldak. Its population in 2010 was 34,739. as of 2010. It is a relatively new town. founded after coal mines around Zonguldak were discovered. In 1926 the coal company of Kozlu was founded. In 1936 the government of Turkey bought Kozlu's coal mines and the surrounding other mines.  At the present Kozlu is a typical mining town.

References

Populated places in Zonguldak Province
Towns in Turkey
Zonguldak Central District
Populated coastal places in Turkey